Joyeuxella is a genus of parasitic Alveolata of the phylum Apicomplexa.

There is one species in this genus - Joyeuxella toxoides.

History

The species and genus was described in 1902 by Brazil.

Description

This species infects the digestive tract of the trumpet worm Pectinaria koreni Malmgren 1866.

References

Apicomplexa genera